The Acme Building is a historic three-story building in Billings, Montana. It was designed in the Western Commercial style with Classical Revival and American Craftsman features on the facade, and built in 1911-1912. It was known as the Acme Theater in 1912 and the Broadway Theater from 1912 to 1916, followed by the Regent Theater until the 1930s. It has been listed on the National Register of Historic Places since November 9, 2005.

References

Commercial buildings completed in 1912
National Register of Historic Places in Yellowstone County, Montana
Theatres on the National Register of Historic Places in Montana
1912 establishments in Montana